According to the 2019 census, there are 706,992 ethnic Russians in Belarus, which accounts for approximately 7.5 percent of the population of Belarus. Ten years earlier there were 785,084 ethnic Russians in Belarus, meaning that the Russian population in Belarus decreased 10 percent between 2009 and 2019, while the total population of Belarus decreased by 1 percent in the same period. Nevertheless, Russians are still the largest ethnic minority in the country.

History
Many Russian-Belarusians are descendants of people who migrated to Belarus during the Soviet times, as technical specialists and military or administrative personnel. There is also a minor group of Old Believers who settled in Belarus in the XVIII century.

In early Soviet times the Moscow-appointed Belarusian government was largely formed from non-Belarusians like  Panteleimon Ponomarenko or Nikolay Gikalo.

There is a large proportion of ethnic Russians among the current political leadership around Alexander Lukashenko.

Censuses show a constant decline of the number of people identifying themselves as Russians in Belarus due to the process of assimilation.

See also

Ethnic Russians in post-Soviet states
Belarusians in Russia

References

Ethnic groups in Belarus
Belarus
Russian diaspora in Europe